The Color is a Canadian Christian music group from Winkler, Manitoba. They are most noted for their 2017 album First Day of My Life, which won the Juno Award for Contemporary Christian/Gospel Album of the Year at the Juno Awards of 2018.

The band is led by singer Jordan Janzen, with James Shiels on keyboards, guitars and backing vocals, Larry Abrams on guitar and vocals, and Tyson Unrau on drums.

Discography
The Color (2012)
With Outlines (2013)
Eyes Wide Open (2015)
First Day of My Life (2017)
Prayer to Jesus (Acoustic Version) (EP, 2021)
Call of the Wild (EP, 2021)
Better Way (EP, 2021)
No Greater Love (2021)

References

External links

Canadian Christian musical groups
Juno Award for Contemporary Christian/Gospel Album of the Year winners
Musical groups from Manitoba